Joseph V. Grieco (March 17, 1915 – January 2, 2006) was a former Republican member of the Pennsylvania House of Representatives.

References

1915 births
2006 deaths
Republican Party members of the Pennsylvania House of Representatives
20th-century American politicians